The 2014–15 EHF Cup group stage, corresponding to the fourth round of the 2014–15 EHF Cup, will be played from 11 February to 22 March 2015.

Format
Sixteen teams, advancing from the third round, were drawn into four groups of four teams. In each group, teams play each other in a double round-robin system with home-and-away matches. Group winners and runners-up teams will advance to the knockout stage.

Seedings
The seedings were published on 3 December 2014, and the draw took place on the following day at 11:00 local time, in Vienna, Austria.

Notes

Group A

Group B

Group C

Group D

References

External links
EHF Cup (official website)

EHF Cup seasons
2015 in handball